Leonard McNaughton (15 January 1884 – 26 December 1970) was an Australian cricketer. He played eight first-class cricket matches for Victoria between 1912 and 1920. He played district cricket from 1911-12 to 1924-25 and took 334 wickets at an average of 17 mostly for East Melbourne. He was awarded life membership of the Hawthorn-East Melbourne Cricket Club in 1931.

See also
 List of Victoria first-class cricketers

References

External links
 

1884 births
1970 deaths
Australian cricketers
Victoria cricketers
Cricketers from Melbourne